Söderströms Förlags Ab is a Finnish Swedish-language publishing company, founded in 1891 by publisher Werner Söderström.

Gustaf Leopold Söderström had started a printing company and publishing house in 1860, Söderström & Co.  His son, Werner Söderström, who had been had been active as a publisher since 1878, took over his father's publishing business in 1888. In 1891 he decided to divide his Swedish- and Finnish-language publishing activities between two corporations. The Finnish part became Werner Söderströms (commonly referred to as WSOY) while the Swedish part was sold to Förlags AB Söderström in order to allow him to concentrate on the Finnish publishing.

In 2012, Förlags AB Söderström merged with Schildts to form Schildts & Söderströms. It was one of the two major Swedish publishing houses in Finland, and after the merger the market was dominated by one company. WSOY, in turn, was acquired by Sanoma in 1999 and later sold to Bonnier Group in 2011.

References

External links
Official website

Book publishing companies of Finland
Finnish companies established in 1860